The Sea Rescue Unit is a voluntary organisation part of the Lebanese Civil Defense. Its main task is saving lives at sea around the Lebanese coast. The others tasks include the fire fighting at sea and marine environment stewardship.

Stations
The sea rescue unit of the Lebanese Civil Defense has 4 main station trying to cover the 200Km of the Lebanese coast:
Kaslik Sea rescue station which serves as Headquarters of the sea rescue unit and is located north of Beirut in the Mount Lebanon Governorate
Batroun Sea rescue station, located in the North Governorate
Jiyeh Sea rescue station, located south of Beirut in the Mount Lebanon Governorate
Tyre Sea Rescue station, located in the South Governorate

Equipment
The Sea Rescue Unit has different types of boats including:
 High speed boats, some of them equipped with small water cannon for external fire fighting
 Inflatable boats
 Personal watercraft
In addition the sea rescue unit has different types of diving materials and oil pollution response equipment including different types of containment booms.

See also 
 German Maritime Search and Rescue Service
 Koninklijke Nederlandse Redding Maatschappij
 Redningsselskapet
 Royal National Lifeboat Institution
 Sociedad de Salvamento y Seguridad Marítima
 Société Nationale de Sauvetage en Mer
 Swedish Sea Rescue Society
 US Coast Guard

References

External links 
 official site (Arabic)
Sea rescue organizations
Emergency services in Lebanon
Medical and health organisations based in Lebanon